Corycaeidae is a family of cyclopoid copepods in the order Cyclopoida. There are about 10 genera and more than 70 described species in Corycaeidae.

Genera
These 10 genera belong to the family Corycaeidae:
 Agetus Krøyer, 1849
 Corycaeus Dana, 1846
 Ditrichocorycaeus Dahl M., 1912
 Farranula C. B. Wilson, 1932
 Monocorycaeus Dahl M., 1912
 Monocoryceus
 Onchocorycaeus Dahl M., 1912
 Onychocorycaeus Dahl M., 1912
 Urocorycaeus Dahl, 1912
 Urocoryceus

References

Cyclopoida
Articles created by Qbugbot
Crustacean families